The Bajaj Chetak is an Indian-made motor scooter produced by the Bajaj Auto company from 1972 to 2006. The Chetak is named after Chetak, the legendary horse of the Great Indian Warrior Maharana Pratap.

History

Originally based on Italian Vespa Sprint, Chetak was an affordable means of transportation for millions of Indian families for decades and is lovingly called Hamara Bajaj (Our Bajaj).

Around 1980, the Vespa-licensed design was replaced with an all-new in-house design that shared the same general appearance and style. During its heyday its chief competitor was LML NV made by LML India as a licensed copy of the Vespa PX 150. In the face of rising competition from bikes and cars, Chetak lost ground in India, and production was discontinued in 2005 as Bajaj Auto stopped manufacturing scooters altogether.

Chetak Electric 

On 16 October 2019, Bajaj Auto re-entered the scooter space by unveiling a new electric version of their Chetak scooter under the Urbanite EV sub-brand. The production of the Chetak Electric started on September 25, 2019, at the Chakan plant of Bajaj Auto. It was initially launched in Pune (4 dealerships) and Bangalore (13 dealerships) in January 2020 and was sold through select KTM dealerships.

The Bajaj Chetak Electric Scooter is an electric two-wheeler from Bajaj Automaker, one of India's leading automakers. Chetak Electric is the latest retro style electric scooter with a design inspired by the image of his Bajaj Chetak scooter which was one of India's most popular scooters in the 80's and 90's.

Bajaj Chetak Electric is equipped with his 4 kW electric motor that develops 5.36 horsepower and 16 Nm of torque. The scooter is powered by a 3kWh lithium-ion battery pack that provides a range of up to 95km on a single charge. The scooter also has a reverse mode to help with parking and maneuvering in tight spaces.

Features 
Chetak electric has features like reverse gear mode, key-less function, combo brake. It also gives an indication/warning of low fuel and low battery on a fully digital LCD screen.

References

External links 

 

Motor scooters
Chetak
Indian motor scooters